Rühle is a German surname. Notable people with the surname include:

 Alice Rühle-Gerstel (1894–1943), German-Jewish writer, feminist, and psychologist
 August Otto Rühle von Lilienstern (1780–1847), Prussian officer
 Frank Rühle (born 1944), German rower who competed for East Germany both in the 1968 and 1972 Summer Olympics
 Günther Rühle (1924–2021), German theatre critic, author and theatre manager.
 Heide Rühle (born 1948), German politician and Member of the European Parliament
 Hugo Rühle (1824–1888), German physician
 Otto Rühle (1874–1943), German council communist
 Stephanie Ruhle (born 1975), managing editor and news anchor for Bloomberg Television and editor-at-large for Bloomberg News
 Tobias Rühle (born 1991), German footballer
 Vern Ruhle, (1951–2007) former American right-handed pitcher and coach in Major League Baseball

See also
Rhule, surname
Rule (surname)

German-language surnames